is a retired Japanese footballer who played mostly for Grulla Morioka.

Career
In December 2018, at only age 26, Anraku retired to join the club's academy as a staff member.

Club statistics
Updated to 23 December 2018.

References

External links

Profile at Grulla Morioka

1992 births
Living people
Tokai Gakuen University alumni
Association football people from Nara Prefecture
Japanese footballers
J3 League players
Japan Football League players
MIO Biwako Shiga players
Iwate Grulla Morioka players
Association football defenders